Catch the Throne is a two-volume mixtape. The first volume was released digitally on March 7, 2014, and on CD on March 28, 2014 as a free mix tape that features various rap artists to help promote the HBO series Game of Thrones. The albums feature hip hop artists including Snoop Dogg, Ty Dolla $ign, Common, Wale, Daddy Yankee, as well as music by Ramin Djawadi from the show and some voices from the show.

Reception
The album received mostly mixed reviews from critics and fans alike.

Track listing

Volume I 
To help promote the series to a broader audience including multicultural urban youth, HBO commissioned an album of rap songs dedicated to Game of Thrones.  Entitled Catch the Throne, it was published for free on SoundCloud on March 7, 2014.

Volume II 
A second volume of songs was released in March 2015, prior to the beginning of the fifth season of Game of Thrones.  This volume again consisted of songs from hip-hop artists, but this time also included contributions from several heavy metal bands. It was released as a free download on iTunes and SoundCloud.

References

2014 mixtape albums
2015 mixtape albums
Music of Game of Thrones
Hip hop compilation albums
Ramin Djawadi